"South Sudan Oyee!" is the national anthem of South Sudan; it was selected as such by the South Sudan National Anthem Committee of the Sudan People's Liberation Movement following the launch of a competition to find a national anthem in August 2010. This preceded the independence referendum in January 2011 that led to South Sudan becoming a sovereign state on 9 July 2011. "Oyee!" is an equivalent of "Hurrah!"

History
The committee received 49 entries for the anthem. The working title of the winning entry was "Land of Kush". A competition was held on live television in 2010.

The winning music was composed by students and teachers of Juba University. The Music Department was led by an Arab originally from the north.

The original version was drafted by Dr. Achier Deng Akol in 2005, following the Comprehensive Peace Agreement, when it became clear that South Sudan may become independent. This original version, entitled "South Sudan Oyee", underwent a lot of improvement via specialised committees headed by Sudan People's Liberation Army General Malak Awien and former Minister of Information of South Sudan Dr. Barnaba Martial Benjamin.

Lyrics

See also

 Flag of South Sudan
 Coat of arms of South Sudan

References

External links
 on live TV
 on live TV
South Sudan's national anthem (MP3 audio file) played by the United States Navy Band

National anthems
South Sudanese music
National symbols of South Sudan
2011 songs
African anthems
National anthem compositions in E-flat major